Cesaretti is an Italian surname. Notable people with the surname include:

Cristian Cesaretti (born 1987), Italian footballer
Daniele Cesaretti (born 1954), Sammarinese cyclist
Gusmano Cesaretti, Italian photographer
Spartaco Cesaretti (born 1921), Sammarinese sport shooter

Italian-language surnames